The 1986 Asia Golf Circuit was the 25th season of golf tournaments that comprised the Asia Golf Circuit.

Taiwan's Lu Hsi-chuen claimed the overall circuit title for a record equalling fourth time, having previously won in 1979, 1980 and 1981.

Tournament schedule
The table below shows the 1986 Asian Golf Circuit schedule. Due to economic turmoil in the Philippines, the Philippine Open was dropped from the circuit in 1984, and continued as a non-circuit event in 1986.

Final standings
The Asia Golf Circuit operated a points based system to determine the overall circuit champion, with points being awarded in each tournament to the leading players. At the end of the season, the player with the most points was declared the circuit champion, and there was a prize pool to be shared between the top players in the points table.

References

Asia Golf Circuit
Asia Golf Circuit